Flight 610 may refer to:

United Airlines Flight 610, crashed on 30 June 1951
Iberia Airlines Flight 610, crashed on 19 February 1985
Lion Air Flight 610, crashed on 29 October 2018

0610